Gilbert Recordon (born 15 January 1931) is a Swiss field hockey player. He competed at the 1952 Summer Olympics and the 1960 Summer Olympics.

References

External links
 

1931 births
Possibly living people
Swiss male field hockey players
Olympic field hockey players of Switzerland
Field hockey players at the 1952 Summer Olympics
Field hockey players at the 1960 Summer Olympics